Dan Patlak (born March 1962) is an American politician who has served as a member of the Cook County Board of Review from the 1st district from 2010 to 2020. Before this he served as Wheeling Township assessor from 2005 to 2010.

Early life, education, and career
Patlak was born in March 1962.

Patlak graduated from Valparaiso University with a bachelor's degree in business administration.

Patlak worked as a real estate broker from 1986 until 1995.

In the 1990s, Patlak became an anti-tax activist. From 1992 to 1994, he was a volunteer coordinator for Citizens Against Government Waste. He organized "Tax Action Day Rallies" at the Kluczynski Federal Building and Daley Plaza. He testified before the Cook County Board of Commissioners in opposition to a $0.75 county sales tax.

Patlak is a Graduate of the Real Estate Institute and is a member of the National Realtors Association and Illinois Realtors Association.

Patlak served on the East Maine Elementary School District 63 Board from 1995 to 1997, having won election to it in 1995.

He served as press secretary for Al Salvi during Salvi's 1996 U.S. Senate campaign.

From January 1999 to December 2006, he was employed at the Cook County Board of Review as a property assessment appeal analyst and public information officer for commissioner Maureen Murphy.

Patlak became a Certified Illinois Assessing Officer.

Patak is a member of the National Taxpayers Union. He is also a member of the International Association of Assessing Officers.

In 2005, Patlak was elected the assessor of Wheeling Township, unseating 24-year incumbent Dolores Stephen. He was reelected in 2009, running unopposed.

Cook County Board of Review
In 2010, Patlak was elected to the Cook County Board of Review from the 1st district. In the Republican primary, he defeated Sean M. Morrison. In the general election, he unseated first-term Democratic incumbent Brendan Houlihan.

Patlak was reelected in 2012 and 2016.

Patlak gave his support to Illinois Senate Bill 3356, which would extend the period for payment of delinquent property taxes from nine months to thirteen months.

In 2020, he was unseated by Democratic nominee Tammy Wendt.

Personal life
Patlak resides in Wheeling, Illinois with his wife Dulce and son Teddy. He is a member of his local Knights of Columbus chapter.

Electoral history

East Maine Elementary School District 63 Board

Wheeling Township Assessor

Cook County Board of Review
2010

2012

2016

2020

References

Cook County, Illinois
Valparaiso University alumni
Real estate brokers
Illinois Republicans
Members of the Cook County Board of Review
People from Wheeling, Illinois
1962 births
Living people